Tetrops mongolicus is a species of beetle in the family Cerambycidae. It was described by Murzin in 1977. It is known from Mongolia.

References

Tetropini
Beetles described in 1977